Joseph Zema  (born August 10, 1994) is a professional Canadian football punter for the Montreal Alouettes of the Canadian Football League (CFL).

University career 
Zema played college football for the Incarnate Word Cardinals in 2017 as a graduate transfer from Australian Catholic University.

Professional career

San Antonio Commanders 
Following his college career, Zema had tryouts with the National Football League's New York Jets, Tampa Bay Buccaneers, Jacksonville Jaguars, but was not signed. Instead, he signed with the San Antonio Commanders of the Alliance of American Football in 2019 where he had 37 punts with a 45.8-yard average. His contract was terminated following the dissolution of the league on April 2, 2019.

Montreal Alouettes 
Zema was declared eligible for the 2021 CFL Global Draft where he was drafted sixth overall by the Montreal Alouettes. He then signed with the team on June 8, 2021. He earned the job as the team's punter following training camp and played in all 14 regular season games where he punted 90 times with a 45.2-yard average.

In 2022, Zema continued his strong play where he played in all 18 regular season games and had 85 punts with a 47.3-yard average.

Personal life 
Murray was born in Melbourne, Victoria, to parents Nick and Antonietta Zema. He has one brother, Matthew.

References

External links 
Montreal Alouettes bio 

1994 births
Living people
American football punters
Australian players of American football
Australian players of Canadian football
Canadian football punters
Incarnate Word Cardinals football players
Montreal Alouettes players
San Antonio Commanders players
Sportspeople from Melbourne